Plottes is a commune in the Saône-et-Loire department in the region of Bourgogne-Franche-Comté in eastern France.

Plottes was part of Tournus between January 1, 1973 and March 11, 2001.

See also
Communes of the Saône-et-Loire department

References

Communes of Saône-et-Loire